Clifford D. Chatman (born March 13, 1959) is a former American football fullback in the National Football League (NFL) for the New York Giants.  He played college football at the University of Central Oklahoma and was drafted in the fourth round of the 1981 NFL Draft.

1959 births
Living people
People from Clinton, Oklahoma
American football fullbacks
New York Giants players
Central Oklahoma Bronchos football players